Diego Jesús Alvarado Rodríguez (born 20 November 1991) is a Chilean professional footballer who plays as a striker for Primera B de Chile club Deportes Melipilla.

Club career
A product of Unión San Felipe youth system, he has played for several clubs in Chilean football. In the Chilean Primera División, he has played for Unión San Felipe, Curicó Unido and Deportes Melipilla.

Abroad, he played for Venezuelan club Aragua in 2020. Then, he returned to Chile to join Santiago Morning.

International career
Alvarado represented Chile at under-20 level in friendly matches against Uruguay U20 played in 2010, alongside players such as Enzo Roco and César Pinares.

Personal life
His father, Arturo, was a professional footballer who played for Trasandino in the 1980s.

References

External links
 
 
 Diego Alvarado at PlaymakerStats

1991 births
Living people
Footballers from Santiago
Chilean footballers
Chilean expatriate footballers
Chile under-20 international footballers
Unión San Felipe footballers
Trasandino footballers
Deportes Temuco footballers
Coquimbo Unido footballers
Puerto Montt footballers
Deportes Magallanes footballers
Magallanes footballers
Curicó Unido footballers
Cobreloa footballers
San Luis de Quillota footballers
Aragua FC players
Santiago Morning footballers
San Antonio Unido footballers
Deportes Melipilla footballers
Chilean Primera División players
Tercera División de Chile players
Segunda División Profesional de Chile players
Primera B de Chile players
Venezuelan Primera División players
Chilean expatriate sportspeople in Venezuela
Expatriate footballers in Venezuela
Association football forwards